"Frog Went a-Courtin (Roud No. 16) is an English-language folk song. Its first known appearance is in Wedderburn's Complaynt of Scotland (1549) under the name "The Frog cam to the Myl dur", though this is in Scots rather than English. There is a reference in the London Company of Stationers' Register of 1580 to "A Moste Strange Weddinge of the Frogge and the Mouse." There are many texts of the ballad; however the oldest known musical version is in Thomas Ravenscroft's Melismata in 1611.

Summary
The lyrics involve a frog courting a mouse (Missie Mouse). The mouse is willing to marry the frog, but she must ask permission of Uncle Rat.  In other versions such as "King Kong Kitchie Kitchie Ki-Me-O" by Chubby Parker, the frog fights and kills Miss Mouse's other suitors (an owl, bat and bumblebee) after they interrupt his proposal. Uncle Rat's permission received, the two work out details of the wedding.  Some versions end with a cat, snake or other creature devouring or chasing the couple and wedding guests. Sometimes the frog gets away, but is later swallowed by a duck. Usually, the final verse states that there's a piece of food on the shelf, and that if the listener wants to hear more verses, they have to sing it themselves.

Origin
Spaeth has a note claiming that the original version of this was supposed to refer to François, Duke of Anjou's wooing of Elizabeth I of England; however, this was in 1579 and the original Scottish version was already published. If the second known version (1611, in Melismata, also reprinted in Chappell) were the oldest, this might be possible — there are seeming political references to "Gib, our cat" and "Dick, our Drake." But the Wedderburn text, which at least anticipates the song, predates the reign of Queen Elizabeth by nine years, and Queen Mary by four. If it refers to any queen at all, it would seemingly have to be Mary Stuart.  Evelyn K. Wells, however, in the liner notes to the LP Brave Boys; New England traditions in folk music (New World Records 239, 1977), suggests that the original may have been satirically altered in 1580 when it was recorded in the register of the London Company of Stationers, as this would have been at the height of the unpopular courtship.

According to Albert Jack in his book "Pop Goes the Weasel, The Secret Meanings of Nursery Rhymes" (pp. 33–37, copyright 2008), the earliest known version of the song was published in 1549 as "The Frog Came to the Myl Dur" in Robert Wedderburn's "Complaynt of Scotland".  He states that in 1547 the Scottish Queen Consort, Mary of Guise, under attack from Henry VIII, sought to marry her daughter Princess Mary (later Mary Queen of Scots), "Miss Mouse", to the three-year old French Prince Louis, the "frog".  The song resurfaced a few years later, with changes, when another French (frog) wooing caused concern—that of the Duke of Anjou and Queen Elizabeth I in 1579. Elizabeth even nicknamed Anjou, her favorite suitor, "the frog". 

Another theory traces the song to Suffolk: "Roley, Poley, Gammon and Spinach" refer to four families of Suffolk notables, Rowley, Pole, Bacon and Greene.

Popular culture

The song has been heard by many people (as "Froggie Went a-Courtin) in the 1955 Tom and Jerry cartoon Pecos Pest, which uses a version arranged and performed by Shug Fisher, in character as "Uncle Pecos." In Pecos Pest, Jerry's Uncle Pecos stays with him while getting ready for a television appearance, and continues to pluck Tom's whiskers to use as guitar strings throughout the cartoon. It is an improvised version with many lyrics that are unintelligible, and many changed. For example, he stutters and gives up when he tries to say "hickory tree" and says "way down yonder by the ...", stammers out the names of several types of trees, finally settling (ironically) on "eucalyptus". He also mentions while continuing the music "That's the hard part right in there, n-n-n-n-nephew!" and "there's a yodel in thar somewhar, but it's a little too high f'r me."

Some refer to this song as "Crambone", as it is repeated at the end of many lines and said more clearly than the other words in this version. For example, the line is "Froggie went a-courtin' he did ride/Crambone". Fisher, in character as Pecos, delivers the coda with a glottal stutter on the letter c. Woody Guthrie's version used "Hey-hey", and Bob Dylan's version used "uh-huh" in the same way after several lines.

Other examples in film and TV include: 
 American composer William Grant Still featured the song in his Miniatures trio (1948) and later, quintet (1963).
 In the 1941 film Sergeant York, sung by Lee White.
 Keith (played by Roger Sloman) plays a version on banjo before being distracted by a 'lovely robin' in Mike Leigh's Nuts in May.
 In "The Muppets Valentine Show" (a 1973 pilot version of The Muppet Show), Kermit the Frog goes a-courtin' Miss Mousey—and ends up fighting a giant rat romantic rival. In the end, Miss Mousey goes off with a third suitor while Kermit and the rat lie prone nearby, exhausted from their battle.
 A 1977 animated version of the folk tune features a happier ending for Froggie and Miss Mousie: they honeymoon around the world and give birth to two frog/mouse combination children and complete the song with "If you want more, you've got to sing it yourself!"-
In the 1980 film, Little Darlings, the girls are singing it when Angel (Kristy McNichol) returns after having sex with Randy in the boathouse.
In the 1983 Blake Edwards remake of The Man Who Loved Women, Barry Corbin's character sings this song as he undresses for sex with his wife, played by Kim Basinger.
 Ethan Hawke's character Troy Dyer is singing the song on his guitar at the end of the film Reality Bites when Winona Ryder's character Lelaina Pierce comes and tackles him on the couch.
 A version is sung in the 1993 The World of Peter Rabbit and Friends animated adaption of The Tailor of Gloucester. This is one of the versions that uses the lyric "Kitty Alone".
 Danny Tanner briefly sings the song while giving his oldest daughter D.J. guitar lessons in the sitcom Full House, in the episode "The Seven Month Inch (Part 2)".
Thomas Raith hums the song during a standoff with the Denarians in Jim Butcher's Small Favor, a novel of the Dresden Files.
 The Dexter's Laboratory episode "Hamhocks and Armlocks" begins with the titular Dexter and his family singing the song on a road trip.
 Bender sings a version of the song in the Futurama episode "Bendin' in the Wind".
 Bobby Hill is heard to sing the opening verse on an episode of King of the Hill.
 It has also been used in the episode of The Colbert Report that aired on May 23, 2007. This version was sung by Burl Ives. Colbert also sung a portion of the song on the June 18, 2007 episode, during an interview with Toby Keith.
 The song was performed on The Fast Show by the character Bob Fleming as one of 'Bob Fleming's Country Favourites'.
 An explicit adaption of the "King Kong Kitchie-Kitchie Ki-Me-Oh" version, named "What Do You Say" by Mickey Avalon, appeared on the soundtrack of the 2009 film The Hangover.
 Mike Oldfield covered as a B side of Mike Oldfield's Single.
 In Six Feet Under Season 4, Episode 3 "Parallel Play", Russell Corwin, played by Ben Foster, sings the chorus over and over on a stage at a party.
  The song is frequently sung in The Return of Peter Grimm, an RKO film released in 1935, and the second screen adaptation of David Belasco's Broadway hit.  The film starred Lionel Barrymore.
 In 1941, the German composer Paul Hindemith wrote a series of variations "Frog He Went a Courting" for cello and piano.
  In Van Helsing Season 2, Episode 11 "Be True", Sam (Christopher Heyerdahl), repeatedly sings and listens to the song.
 In Barney's Talent Show, the song was told by the puppets and using slightly altered lyrics.
 An instrumental of the song is played in the 1992 VHS "Let's Draw!" in the scene where a number 8 is drawn into a frog.

Other appearances

  In the first volume of Bill Willingham's graphic novel series Fables, the janitor "Flycatcher" (in fairytales, the Frog Prince) sings the opening line as he mops.
 In the novel Good Omens by Terry Pratchett and Neil Gaiman, a reference to the song is made when the character Antony J. Crowley is faced with a large traffic jam, says "hey ho!" To himself and begins ramming his way through, echoing the refrain from Sir Antony Rowley.

Recordings

The song has been recorded by Almeda Riddle, Woody Guthrie, Pete Seeger and many others. Folk singer Burl Ives performed perhaps the most well-known and kid-friendly version, in which Frog and Miss Mousie are wed.
 Elvis Presley version rehearsal jam
 Thomas Ravenscroft version (1611)
 "T. Ravenscroft: Songs, Rounds and Catches", Consort of Musicke, Rooley
 "Cakes and Ale - Catches and Partsongs", Pro Cantione Antiqua, Mark Brown
 Albert Beale: "A Frog He Would a-Wooing Go" (on "Folk Songs of Britain, Vol. X: Animal Songs")
Brothers Four: "Frogg" (Columbia Records single, 1961), US #32; also sequel, "Frogg No. 2" on LP The Brothers Four Song Book (Columbia, 1961)
 Blind Willie McTell: "Hillbilly Willie's Blues" uses the tune of "Frog".
 Anne, Zeke, and Judy Canova (as "Juliet Canova"): "Frog Went a-Courtin (Brunswick 264, 1928; on "The Story that the Crow Told Me, Vol. 2" (2000))
 Elizabeth Cronin: "Uncle Rat Went Out to Ride" (on "Folk Songs of Britain, Vol. X: Animal Songs")
 Drusilla Davis: "Frog Went a-Courting" (AFS 347 B, 1935)
 Danny Dell And The Trends: "Froggy Went a Courting" (Rockin' RR160 single, 1960)
 Excepter "Knock Knock" (or "KK") on the Carrots single.
 Flat Duo Jets: "Frog Went a Courtin on "Go Go Harlem Baby" (1991)
 Otis High & Flarrie Griffin: "Froggie Went a-Courtin (on "Hand-Me-Down Music -- Old Songs, Old Friends: 1 -- Traditional Music of Union County, North Carolina" (1979))
Tom Glazer: Froggie went a courting"
 Bradley Kincaid: "Froggie Went a Courting" (Silvertone 5188, 1927; Supertone 9209, 1928)
 Adolphus Le Ruez: "The Frog and the Mouse" (on "Folk Songs of Britain, Vol. X: Animal Songs")
 Pleaz Mobley: "Froggie Went a-Courting" (AFS; on LC12)
 Chubby Parker: "King Kong Kitchie Kitchie Ki-Me-O" (Columbia 15296D, 1928; on Anthology of American Folk Music, CrowTold01) (Supertone 9731, 1930) (Conqueror 7889, 1931)
 Annie Paterson: "The Frog and the Mouse" (on "Folk Songs of Britain, Vol. X: Animal Songs")
 Unknown artist(s): "A Frog He Would a-Wooing Go" (Harper-Columbia 1162, c. 1919)
 John Jacob Niles: "The Frog Went Courting" (on "American Folk & Gambling Songs", 1956)
 Dorothy Olsen (the Singing Schoolteacher): "Frog Went a-Courtin (children's record, RCA/Bluebird WBY-54)(1956)
 Packie Manus Byrne (Various – Songs From Ulster): "The Frog's Wedding" (Mulligan – LUNA 001 )(Recorded between 1955 and 1962, published in 1977)
 Shug Fisher: "Froggie Went a-Courtin (in MGM "Tom and Jerry" cartoon "Pecos Pest", 1955)
 Tom Tall: "Froggy Went a-Courting" (1958)
 Elvis Presley: "Froggie Went a-Courtin (on "Walk a Mile in My Shoes - The Essential 70's Masters", 1970)
 Tex Ritter: "Froggy Went a-Courtin (on "American Legend", 1973)
 Romina Power: "Paolino maialino"  (with Italian lyrics written by Paolo Limiti, released as single in 1974)
 The Wiggles: "A Froggy He Would a-Wooing Goo" (on "The Wiggles", 1991)
 Bob Dylan: "Froggie Went a Courtin (on Good as I Been to You, 1992)
 Nick Cave and the Bad Seeds: "King Kong Kitchee Kitchee Ki-Mi-O", B-side to the single "Henry Lee" (1996)
 Laurie Berkner: "Froggie Went a-Courtin on Victor Vito (1999)
 Dan Zanes:  "King Kong Kitchie" (Festival Five Records, 2000)
 Mike Oldfield: "Froggy Went a-Courting" (on Mike Oldfield's Single, UK edition, 1974)
 Altan, "Uncle Rat" (on The Blue Idol) (2002)
 The Can Kickers, "Froggy Went a Courtin on Mountain Dudes (2003)
 James Reyne, And the Horse You Rode in On, (2005)
 Bruce Springsteen, "Froggie Went a Courtin (on We Shall Overcome: The Seeger Sessions, 2006)
 Marc Gunn, "Froggie Went a-Courtin (on "A Tribute to Love", 2008)
 Laura Veirs, "King Kong Kitchie Kitchie Ki-Me-O" (on "Tumble Bee: Laura Veirs Sings Folk Songs for Children", 2011)
 Over 150 recorded versions are listed on the "Seeger Sessions" website 
 Tom Scott, "Froggie Went a Courtin" Signature record number 15098 78 RPM
 French adaptation by Claude François : "Monsieur Crapaud" (Mister Toad) (1975)
 Suzy Bogguss, "Froggie Went a-Courtin (on "American Folk Songbook", 2011)
 Elizabeth Mitchell, "Froggie Went a-Courtin on Blue Clouds 2012
 Careful, "Frog Went a'Courting" (on "Because I Am Always Talking", 2012)
 Adaptation of subject matter to a different tune and meter by John McCutcheon on his children's album Howjadoo
 Alfred Deller and The Deller Consort
 Gerhard Schöne, "Frosch und Maus", German re-working of the song (on "Kinderlieder aus aller Welt", 1986)
 Brita Koivunen and the Four Cats singing quartet, "Saku Sammakko", Finnish re-working of the song (on "Mörri-Möykyn toivekonsertti - 27 toivottua lastenlaulua", 1961). 
 Steve Simmons and Dario Ré, Froggy Went a-Courtin' (2021)

Alternative titles

 "A Frog He Would a-Wooing Go"
 "Crambone"
 "Die Padda wou gaan opsit" (Afrikaans version in South Africa)
 "Frog in the Well"
 "Froggie Went a-Courtin
 "Froggy Would a-Wooing Go"
 "The Frog's Wooing"
 "A Frog Went a-Walkin
 "King Kong Kitchie Kitchie Ki-Me-O"
 "There Lived a Puddie in the Well"
 "There Was a Puggie in a Well"
 "Y Broga Bach" (Welsh)
 "Yo para ser feliz quiero un camión"
 "Uncle rat went out to ride"

Notes

Citations

Sources

 Ella Mary Leather, Folk-Lore of Herefordshire (1912/republished 1970), pp. 209–210, "The Frog and the Mouse" (2 texts)
 H. M. Belden, Ballads and Songs Collected by the Missouri Folk-Lore Society (1955), pp. 494–499, "The Frog's Courtship" (7 texts in 3 groups, 2 tunes; several of the texts are short, and IB at least appears to be "Kemo Kimo")
 Vance Randolph, Ozark Folksongs (1946–1950), 108, "The Frog's Courtship" (5 texts plus 5 excerpts, 2 tunes)
 Vance Randolph, Ozark Folksongs, edited and abridged by Norm Cohen (1982), pp. 139–141, "The Frog's Courtship" (1 text, 1 tune—Randolph's 108A)
 The Frank C. Brown Collection of North Carolina Folklore, Volume Three: Folk Songs from North Carolina (1952), 120, "The Frog's Courtship" (7 texts plus 13 excerpts, 2 fragments, and mention of 5 more; "Kemo Kimo" in appendix)
 Arthur Palmer Hudson, Folksongs of Mississippi and their Background (1936), 136, pp. 282–283, "The Frog's Courting" (1 text plus mention of 9 more)
 Dorothy Scarborough, A Song Catcher in Southern Mountains (1937), pp. 244–248, "The Frog He Went a-Courting" (3 texts, the first two, with local titles "Frog Went a-Courting" and "Frog Went Courting" and tune on p. 420, are this song; the third item, "The Gentleman Frog", is separate, probably part of the "Kemo Kimo"/"Frog in the Well" family)
 Dorothy Scarborough, On the Trail of Negro Folk-Songs (1925), pp. 46–48, "Frog Went a-Courtin; p. 48, (no title); pp. 48–50, "Mister Frog" (3 texts, 1 tune)
 Paul G. Brewster, Ballads and Songs of Indiana (1940), 42, "The Frog Went a-Courting" (5 texts plus an excerpt and mention of 4 more, 3 tunes—one of them of the "Kitty Alone" type)
 Mary O. Eddy, Ballads and Song from Ohio (1939), 44, "The Frog and the Mouse" (5 texts, 2 tunes)
 Emelyn Elizabeth Gardner and Geraldine Jencks Chickering, Ballads and Songs of Southern Michigan (1939), 189, "The Frog's Courtship" (2 texts plus an exceprt and mention of 5 more, 3 tunes)
 Elisabeth Bristol Greenleaf and Grace Yarrow Mansfield, Ballads and Sea Songs of Newfoundland (1933), 40, "The First Come in it was a Rat" (1 text)
 Creighton-Senior, pp. 250–254, "The Frog and the Mouse" (3 texts plus 4 fragments, 2 tunes)
 Helen Creighton, Songs and Ballads from Nova Scotia (original edition 1932; with added postscript 1966), 89, "It Was a Mouse" (1 text, 1 tune)
 Helen Creighton, Folksongs from Southern New Brunswick (1971), 83, "The Frog and the Mouse" (1 text, 1 tune)
 W. Roy Mackenzie, Ballads and Sea Songs from Nova Scotia (1963), 155, "A Frog He Would a Wooing Go" (1 text, 1 tune)
 Helen Hartness Flanders and Marguerite Olney, Ballads Migrant in New England (1953), pp. 11–13, "Gentleman Froggie" (1 text, 1 tune)
 Eloise Hubbard Linscott, Folk Songs of Old New England (1939), pp. 199–202, "A Frog He Would a-Wooing Go" (1 text, 1 tune)
 Peter Kennedy, Folksongs of Britain and Ireland (1975), 294, "The Frog and the Mouse" (1 text, 1 tune)
 W. K. McNeil, Southern Folk Ballads, Volume II (1988), pp. 41–43, "Frog Went a-Courtin" (1 text, 1 tune)
 Loraine Wyman and Howard Brockway, Lonesome Tunes: Folk Songs from the Kentucky Mountains, Volume I (1916), I, p. 25, "Frog Went a-Courting" (1 text, 1 tune)
 Loraine Wyman and Howard Brockway, Lonesome Tunes: Folk Songs from the Kentucky Mountains, Volume I (1916), II, p. 86, "The Toad's Courtship" (1 text, 1 tune)
 Edith Fulton Fowke (Literary Editor) and Richard Johnston (Music Editor), Folk Songs of Canada (1954), pp. 170–171, "A Frog He Would a-Wooing Go" (1 text, 1 tune)
 Norman Cazden, Herbert Haufrecht, Norman Studer, Folk Songs of the Catskills (1982), 142, "Missie Mouse" (1 text, 1 tune)
 Cecil Sharp & Maud Karpeles, 80 English Folk Songs (1968), 75, "The Frog and the Mouse" (1 text, 1 tune—a composite version)
 Carl Sandburg, The American Songbag (1927), p. 143, "Mister Frog Went a-Courting" (1 text, 1 tune)
 John Anthony Scott, The Ballad of America (1966), pp. 339–341, "The Mouse's Courting Song" (1 text, 1 tune)
 Moses Asch, Josh Dunson and Ethel Raim, Anthology of American Folk Music (1973), p. 32 "King Kong Kitchie Kitchie Ki-Me-O" (1 text, 1 tune)
 John A. Lomax and Alan Lomax, American Ballads and Folk Songs (1934), pp. 310–313, "Frog Went a-Courtin (1 text, 1 tune)
 B. A. Botkin, A Treasury of New England Folklore (1965), pp. 571–572, "The Frog in the Spring" (1 text, 1 tune)
 B. A. Botkin, A Treasury of Southern Folklore (1949; reprinted 1977), p. 722, "Frog Went a-Courting" (1 text, 1 tune)
 Pete Seeger, American Favorite Ballads: Tunes and Songs as sung by Pete Seeger (1961), p. 56, "Froggie Went a-Courtin (1 text, 1 tune)
 Marcia and Jon Pankake, A Prairie Home Companion Folk Song Book (1988), pp. 48–49, "Froggie Went a-Courting" (1 text)
 John Harrington Cox, Folk Songs of the South (1925), 162, "The Frog and the Mouse" (3 texts plus mention of two more including some excerpts, 1 tune)
 JHCoxIIB, #22A-E, pp. 174–182, "Mr. Mouse Went a-Courting", "The Frog and the Mouse", "Frog Went a-Courting", "A Frog He Would a-Wooing Go" (3 texts plus 2 fragments, 5 tunes)
 Iona and Peter Opie, The Oxford Dictionary of Nursery Rhymes (1997), 175, "A Frog He Would a-Wooing Go" (3 texts)
 William S. Baring-Gould and Ceil Baring-Gould, The Annotated Mother Goose (1962), #69, pp. 77–79, "(There was a frog liv'd in a well)" (a complex composite with a short version of "Frog Went a-Courting" plus enough auxiliary verses to make an almost complete "Kemo Kimo" text)
 William Chappell, Old English Popular Music. Revised by H. Ellis Wooldridge (1893), I, pp. 142–143, "The Wedding of the Frog and Mouse" (1 text, 1 tune)
 Fred and Irwin Silber, Folksinger's Wordbook (1973), p. 403, "Frog Went a-Courtin (1 text)
 W. Bruce Olson, "Broadside Ballad Index: Incomplete Contents Listing of 17th Century Broadside Ballad Collections, With a Few Ballads and Garlands of the 18th Century.", ZN3249, "It was a frog in a well"
 Dick Greenhaus & Susan Friedman (editors), "The Digital Tradition", 306, FRGCORT2* PUDDYWL2
 Roud Folk Song Index #16

External links

 "Froggie Went a Courtin lyrics by Bob Dylan
 , a website by David Highland with lyrics for many different versions of song
 Watch the animated adaptation Frog Went a-Courting (National Film Board of Canada)
 Sheet music for a version of the traditional song
 http://www.folklorist.org/song/Frog_Went_A-Courting

American folk songs
Bob Dylan songs
Scottish children's songs
Woody Guthrie songs
Burl Ives songs
Traditional ballads
Traditional children's songs
Nursery rhymes of uncertain origin
Songwriter unknown
Year of song unknown
Songs about amphibians
Fictional frogs